Nanya Institute of Technology is a private college in Zhongli District, Taoyuan City, Taiwan.

NIT offers undergraduate programs in several fields of engineering and technology, including electrical engineering, computer science, information management, mechanical engineering, and industrial engineering. The institution also offers a graduate program in electrical engineering.

History
The college was founded in 1969 as Nanya Polytechnic. It was then later renamed as Taoyuan Innovation Institute of Technology and then Nanya Institute of Technology.

Faculties
 College of Business and Management
 College of Design
 College of Engineering
 College of Human Ecology

Transportation
The college is accessible South East from Zhongli Station of the Taiwan Railways.

See also
 List of universities in Taiwan

References

External links

 

1969 establishments in Taiwan
Educational institutions established in 1969
Universities and colleges in Taoyuan City